Kevin Reddick (born December 28, 1989) is an American football linebacker who is currently a free agent. He played college football at North Carolina. He was signed by the New Orleans Saints as an undrafted free agent in 2013.

High school
Reddick attended New Bern High School in New Bern, North Carolina, and also attended Hargrave Military Academy in Chatham, Virginia. He was a varsity starter as a sophomore at fullback, and earned offensive MVP honors in the state 4-AA finals as a senior at that position after scoring two touchdowns to end Charlotte Independence's reign. He was named the Coastal Conference defensive player of the year, and earned first-team all-state honors at linebacker as a senior. He recorded 189 tackles, eight sacks, six forced fumbles and blocked four punts, and also rushed for 163 yards and six touchdowns at fullback, and he earned all-conference and all-area honors as a junior.

Considered a three-star recruit by Rivals.com, he was listed as the no. 33 outside linebacker in the nation. He accepted a scholarship offer from North Carolina over offers from North Carolina State, Virginia and Clemson.  Reddick did not qualify for NCAA eligibility in 2008, leading him to enroll at Hargrave Military Academy. Once eligible to enroll in 2009, he was considered a four-star recruit by both Rivals.com and Scout.com.

College career
During his tenure, he played in 50 games, accumulating 275 tackles, including 36 for loss, 8.5 sacks, two interception and two forced fumbles. As a senior, he was named first-team All-ACC.

Professional career

New Orleans Saints
Reddick was signed as an undrafted free agent by the New Orleans Saints on April 27, 2013. The Saints released Reddick on August 26, 2014.

San Diego Chargers
Reddick signed with the San Diego Chargers on September 23, 2014, and was released October 7, 2014.

Carolina Panthers
Reddick signed with the Carolina Panthers in September 2014. He was released by the Panthers on August 30, 2015, as part of the first wave of roster cuts.

Buffalo Bills
Reddick was claimed off waivers by the Buffalo Bills on September 1, 2015, due to injuries to their linebacking unit. He was released by the Bills on September 5, 2015. On September 6, 2015, the Bills signed Reddick to their practice squad. On November 24, 2015, he was released from practice squad. On December 1, 2015, he was signed to the active roster.

On August 7, 2016, the Bills waived/injured Reddick due to a knee injury. After going unclaimed, he was placed on the team's injured reserve.

References

External links
Tar Heels Bio
Buffalo Bills bio

1989 births
Living people
Sportspeople from New Bern, North Carolina
Players of American football from North Carolina
American football linebackers
North Carolina Tar Heels football players
New Orleans Saints players
San Diego Chargers players
Carolina Panthers players
Buffalo Bills players